Dragon Bleu is a French brand of vodka.  It is distilled and bottled in the Grande Champagne area of France from a blend of three grains: wheat, barley, and rye.  Dragon Bleu is produced by French distiller Patrick Brisset, in Saint-Preuil, France.  Dragon Bleu is 40% alcohol by volume (80 proof).  It is produced using the water of the Gensac Spring.  This vodka fits into the high-priced category.

See also
List of Vodkas

References

External links
Official Website

French vodkas
French brands